Bilgé Ögün Bassani is the chief executive officer of the Association François-Xavier Bagnoud (FXB International), a Swiss-based foundation and NGO whose stated mission is to fight poverty and the spread of HIV/AIDS, among other things.

Bilgé Bassani was born in Ankara, Turkey. Prior to joining FXB, she worked at the United Nations for more than 20 years, most recently as deputy executive director and director of programmes for the United Nations Fund for International Partnerships (UNFIP). UNFIP was established by the United Nations Secretary-General to work with the UN Foundation for channeling Ted Turner's US$1 billion contribution to support UN causes. After joining the UN in 1983 she served as UNICEF Representative in Kigali, Rwanda, and as the Deputy Regional Director of the Geneva Regional Office. Prior to that, she worked with Save the Children USA as the regional director for Africa and the Middle East.

Notes

Living people
Year of birth missing (living people)